LaVive were a German girl group consisting of Meike Ehnert, Sarah Rensing, Julia Köster and Katrin Mehlberg that was formed on the television show Popstars: Girls forever. Their debut album No Sleep was released in December 2010.

The single "I Swear" was released in November 2010 featuring the final eleven contestants of Popstars: Girls forever, and the single "No Time for Sleeping" was released in December 2010.
After LaViVe's record-deal with record label Starwatch/Warner expired in March 2011, Warner did not renew it, which led to the group's disbandment.

Discography

Studio albums

Singles

See also 
Popstars: Girls forever
Monrose
Queensberry
No Angels
Girl group
Bratz

References 

German dance music groups
German girl groups
German pop music groups
Musical groups established in 2010
Musical quartets
Popstars winners
2010 establishments in Germany
Musical groups disestablished in 2011
2011 disestablishments in Germany